Kynan Lyle Griffin  is a South African film producer in the U.S.

Early life 
On January 1, 1979, Griffin was born in Johannesburg, South Africa. Griffin spent most of his formative years in Durban, where he attended Hillcrest High School (South Africa).

Education 
Griffin studied film at Brigham Young University in Provo, Utah. As a student, he produced the short film The Snell Show, which won the Grand Jury Prize at the 2003 Slamdance Film Festival.

Career 
Griffin produced the feature films Pride and Prejudice: A Latter-Day Comedy, Moving McAllister, Orcs!, Paladin: Dawn of the Dragonslayer, The Crown and the Dragon and Osombie.

Griffin is a producer with Camera 40 Productions and founder of Arrowstorm Entertainment.

Griffin also produced the video-game Saga (2008 video game), the world's first MMORTS, and served as the CFO of the gaming studio Silverlode Interactive.

Griffin was one of the founding members of the Provo Cricket Club. He also sits on the board of directors of the War Child Awareness Fund, a non-profit organization aimed at bringing global attention to the issue of child soldiers.

Filmography 
 Moving McAllister (2007) - Producer.

 ORCS! (2011) - Writer. Producer.

References

"Bleedfest is Back!". More Horror. Accessed on December 14, 2011.

External links

Arrowstorm Entertainment
Provo Cricket Club
War Child Awareness Fund

Year of birth missing (living people)
Living people
Brigham Young University alumni
South African film producers
South African cricketers